Huangxing Town is a town in Changsha County, Hunan province, China. It contains two communities and 11 villages. Ganshan township merged with Huangxing on November 19, 2015.

References

Divisions of Changsha County
Changsha County